The Sirius Stakes (Japanese シリウスステークス) is a Grade 3 horse race for Thoroughbreds aged three and over, run in late September or early October over a distance of 2000 metres on dirt at Hanshin Racecourse.

It was first run in 1993 and has held Grade 3 status since 1997. The first six editions of the race took place at Chukyo Racecourse and it was also run at that track in 2006. Originally contested as a 1200 metre sprint the race distance was increased to 1400 metres in 1997 and 1700 metres in 2006. The Sirius Stakes has been run over 2000 metres since 2007.

Winners since 2000 

 The 2020, 2021 and 2022 races took place at Chukyo Racecourse over 2000 metres.

Earlier winners

 1990 - Horino Winner
 1994 - Minamoto Juniors
 1995 - Samsung Queen
 1993 - Yuki Top Run
 1994 - Eishin Washington
 1995 - Nihon Pillow Story
 1996 - Nishino Final
 1997 - Toyo Rainbow
 1998 - Makoto Raiden
 1999 - Gold Tiara

See also
 Horse racing in Japan
 List of Japanese flat horse races

References

Dirt races in Japan